Elisabeth von Herzogenberg née Elisabet von Stockhausen (born in Paris on 13 April 1847; died in Sanremo on 7 January 1892) was a German pianist, composer, singer and philanthropist.

Biography
Her father had served as a Hanoverian ambassador and was a pianist linked to Frédéric Chopin and Charles-Valentin Alkan. Although a Protestant, she married the Catholic Heinrich von Herzogenberg. She is known in large part for her association with Johannes Brahms, with whom she studied and with whom she and her husband corresponded copiously. As an aristocratic musician, she largely did not perform or publish for the public, but did arrange children's folk songs. Her lover, the composer Ethel Smyth, devoted chapter XX of Impressions That Remained: Memoirs to her.

Edited Works

 24 Volkskinderlieder for voice and piano (1881)
 8 Klavierstücke

References 

1847 births
1892 deaths
19th-century classical composers
19th-century classical pianists
19th-century German composers
German classical pianists
German women classical composers
German Romantic composers
German women pianists
Women classical pianists
Women classical composers
19th-century women composers
19th-century women pianists